Anthony David Lema (February 25, 1934 – July 24, 1966) was an American professional golfer who rose to fame in the mid-1960s and won a major title, the 1964 Open Championship at the Old Course at St Andrews in Scotland. He died two years later at age 32 in an aircraft accident near Chicago.

Early life
Born in Oakland, California, Lema's parents were Anthony H. Lema (1899–1937) and Clotilda M. Lema, née Silva (1910–2000), both of Portuguese ancestry. His father died of pneumonia when Tony was three years old, and his widowed mother struggled to raise the family of four children on welfare. He began playing golf as a boy at Lake Chabot municipal golf course and learned different aspects of the game from a variety of people. Noted African-American golf coach Lucius Bateman helped develop his swing and Oakland policeman Ralph Hall taught him course strategy. The golf pros at Lake Chabot, Dick Fry and Bill Burch, trained him on basic golf fundamentals, including the use of a square stance.

At age 17, Lema enlisted in the U.S. Marine Corps and served in Korea. After his discharge from the military in 1955, he obtained work as an assistant to the club professional at a San Francisco golf club.

Eddie Lowery, a wealthy San Francisco businessman, who assisted talented amateur players in the area, helped to sponsor and encourage Lema. Lowery is best known as the 10-year-old caddy of champion Francis Ouimet at the 1913 U.S. Open. Lowery's sponsorship gave Lema $200 a week expense money, to be repaid, in addition to splitting his winnings: Lema received two-thirds, Lowery one-third. One additional detail was that all debts at the end of the year were to be carried forward.

PGA Tour
By 1957, Lema had developed his skills sufficiently to earn his way onto the PGA Tour, winning the Imperial Valley Open in memorable fashion: Assuming he was out of contention, Lema headed to the clubhouse bar, where he drank three highballs. Told that he would face Paul Harney in a sudden-death playoff, a relaxed Lema won the tournament on the second extra hole. The following year, he began developing friendships with a trio of fellow golfers: Johnny Pott, Tommy Jacobs, and Jim Ferree, and during 11 tournaments in 1958, Lema finished in the top 15, winning $10,282 for the year.

The following year, Lema's winnings dropped to $5,900, followed by an even worse year in 1960, when he collected a mere $3,060. A raucous off-the-course lifestyle was taking its toll until he began talking with television producer Danny Arnold, who helped him improve his composure and bolster his confidence.

While Lema's struggles continued in 1962, along with his debt to Lowery reaching over $11,000, his luck changed that autumn. His first tour win came in late September at Las Vegas, three strokes ahead runner-up Don January. Four weeks later, on the eve of his playoff victory at the Orange County Open Invitational in Costa Mesa, California, Lema joked he would serve champagne to the press if he won the next day. From then on he was known as Champagne Tony, and his handsome looks and vivacious personality added to the legend, such that Johnny Miller has stated that at the time of his death in 1966, Lema was second only to Arnold Palmer in fan popularity.

That win sparked an impressive performance over the next four years that saw Lema win twelve official tour events, finish second on eleven occasions, and third four times. From 1963 until his death in July 1966, he finished in the top ten over half of the time and made the cut in every major, finishing in the top ten in eight of the fifteen in which he played. Lema was a member of Ryder Cup teams in 1963 and 1965 with a record of 9–1–1, which remains the best for any player who has played in two or more.

Friend and tour colleague Jack Nicklaus wrote that Lema's play also stabilized and improved greatly after he married Betty Cline, a former airline stewardess, in 1963. One additional reason for Lema's more relaxed play that year was the end of his agreement with Lowery.

In 1963, Lema finished second by one stroke to Nicklaus at the Masters, and missed the playoff for the U.S. Open by two shots, bogeying the last two holes, believing he needed birdies. He won the Memphis Open Invitational later that summer.

Lema won two other tournaments that fall and was named 1963 Most Improved Player by Golf Digest. That winter, he wrote, with Gwylim S. Brown, "Golfers' Gold", an autobiographical account of his eight-year apprenticeship in the competitive cauldron of the PGA Tour.

Major champion
In 1964, Lema won the Bing Crosby National Pro-Am at Pebble Beach, then three tournaments in four weeks: the Thunderbird Classic at Westchester in Rye, New York, the Buick Open Invitational at Warwick Hills in Grand Blanc, Michigan, and the Cleveland Open at Highland Park (in a playoff with Palmer).

Two weeks later at St Andrews, Scotland, Lema captured his only major title at the Open Championship, five shots ahead of runner-up Nicklaus. Before teeing up in the first round, he had only played nine practice holes. Lema had hired Arnold Palmer's regular British caddy, Tip Anderson, since Palmer was not competing that year. Anderson, a descendant of a past Open champion, Jamie Anderson, had grown up on the course.

At the September matchup of the four major champions of 1964, in the 36-hole exhibition World Series of Golf, Lema won $50,000 (then the largest payoff in golf) at Firestone Country Club in Akron, Ohio, over Palmer (Masters), Ken Venturi (U.S. Open) and Bobby Nichols (PGA Championship).

Due to his good looks and recent success, Lema was tapped for a guest appearance in an episode of the TV series Hazel that aired January 7, 1965, in which Hazel misplaces his prized golf clubs. Later that year, he was on The Lawrence Welk Show, where Welk passed the baton to Lema to direct the Champagne Music Makers.

In 1965, Lema won the Buick Open for the second consecutive year, and the Carling World Open, finishing second in prize money to Nicklaus. In fall 1965, he and Nicklaus formed the U.S. team to the World Cup of Golf. Lema's last victory came in 1966 in late May, in his wife's hometown at the Oklahoma City Open, winning by six strokes at Quail Creek. Two weeks later, he recovered from an opening round 78 to nearly capture a third consecutive Buick Open, finishing three shots behind Phil Rodgers, in fourth place.

Death
Following the PGA Championship at Firestone in Akron in late July 1966, Lema and his wife chartered an airplane to fly them to an exhibition tournament south of Chicago: the Little Buick Open at Lincolnshire Country Club in Crete, Illinois. The twin-engine Beechcraft Bonanza, piloted by Doris Mullen, ran out of fuel and crashed into a water hazard short of the seventh green of the nine-hole golf course at Lansing Sportsman's Club in Lansing, about a half mile (0.8 km) northwest of their destination, Lansing Municipal Airport. During the fatal plunge, Mullen swerved left to avoid a group of people standing near the clubhouse. In addition to the Lemas and Mullen, who was a mother of four teenaged children, Dr. George Bard, the copilot and a surgeon, was killed. Bard and Mullen's husband, Wylie, were colleagues as well as owners of the ill-fated plane.

Lema and his wife, Betty, age 30, were buried in California at Holy Sepulchre Cemetery in Hayward after funeral services on July 28 at St. Elizabeth's Church in his hometown of Oakland.

In 1983, a San Leandro public golf course bordering San Francisco Bay was named in his memory as the Tony Lema Golf Course, now part of the Monarch Bay Golf Club complex, just southeast of the Oakland airport. In Ludlow, Massachusetts, the road accessing the local country club is named Tony Lema Drive, and there is a collection of photographs and other items in the clubhouse of Ludlow Country Club featuring Lema.

Professional wins (22)

PGA Tour wins (12)

PGA Tour playoff record (3–1)

Other wins (10)
Note:  This list is probably incomplete.
1957 Imperial Valley Open
1958 Idaho Open
1961 Hesperia Invitational Open, Mexican Open
1962 Mexican Open, Northern California Open, Northern California PGA Championship
1963 Northern California PGA Championship
1964 World Series of Golf, Northern California PGA Championship

Major championships

Wins (1)

Results timeline

CUT = missed the half-way cut
WD = withdrew
"T" = tied

Summary

Most consecutive cuts made – 15 (1963 Masters – 1966 PGA)
Longest streak of top-10s – 2 (three times)

U.S. national team appearances
Professional
Ryder Cup: 1963 (winners), 1965 (winners)
Canada Cup: 1965

References

External links
Sports Illustrated - cover - March 23, 1964
Tony Lema Golf Course Monarch Bay

American male golfers
PGA Tour golfers
Winners of men's major golf championships
Ryder Cup competitors for the United States
Golfers from California
United States Marine Corps personnel of the Korean War
20th-century American memoirists
American people of Portuguese descent
Victims of aviation accidents or incidents in 1966
Victims of aviation accidents or incidents in the United States
Accidental deaths in Illinois
Sportspeople from Oakland, California
People from San Leandro, California
Military personnel from California
Burials in Alameda County, California
1934 births
1966 deaths